Mriter Martye Agaman ( The Return of The Dead) is a Bengali language fantasy comedy film directed by Pashupati Chatterjee. This film was released in 1959 under the banner of  Miracle India Private Limited.

Plot
After going to hell, Bishwanath finds many persons known to him. They plan to make team against Yamraj and escape. Finally, they fly away from hell and land on Earth. They discover that everything has been changed. Their relationships, love and affection became irrelevant in their absence. This bitter experience makes them to decide to go back to hell.

Cast
 Bhanu Bannerjee as Biswanath
 Basabi Nandi		
 Chhabi Biswas
 Tulsi Chakraborty
 Tulsi Lahiri
 Jahar Ganguly
 Jahor Roy
 Amar Mullick
 Tapati Ghosh
 Nitish Mukhopadhyay
 Haradhan Bannerjee

References

External links
 

1959 films
Bengali-language Indian films
1950s fantasy comedy films
Indian fantasy comedy films
1950s Bengali-language films
1959 comedy films